The Autorité de Régulation des Communications Électroniques et des Postes (ARCEP), formerly named Autorité de Réglementation des secteurs de Postes et de Télécommunications (ART&P), is an independent agency in charge of regulating telecommunications and postal services in Togo.

External links

References 

Government  of Togo

Mass media regulation